Wender Coelho da Silva (born August 11, 1982 in Vila Velha), or simply Teco, is a Brazilian central defender. He currently plays for EC São José.

Career
Teco is currently recuperating from a serious knee injury in Gremio's 2-0 win over Fluminense on 20 May 2007, but has signed a 6-month loan extension with Gremio until June 2008. Gremio have been treating and paying for Teco's recovery and Cruzeiro have agreed to the deal because of this. At the end of his contract with Grêmio, Teco have returned to Cruzeiro.

Honours
 Copa do Espírito Santo: 2004
 Campeonato Paulista Série A2: 2005
 Campeonato Gaúcho: 2007

External links

Teco at Soccerterminal  

Teco at Goal.com 
Teco at GloboEsporte 
Teco at Placar

References

1982 births
Living people
Brazilian footballers
Associação Atlética Internacional (Limeira) players
Mirassol Futebol Clube players
Estrela do Norte Futebol Clube players
Esporte Clube São Bento players
Ipatinga Futebol Clube players
Cruzeiro Esporte Clube players
Grêmio Foot-Ball Porto Alegrense players
Botafogo de Futebol e Regatas players
Brasiliense Futebol Clube players
Grêmio Esportivo Brasil players
Association football defenders